The Xiping Stone Classics are a collection of Han dynasty stone carved books on various Confucian classics.  Named for the Xiping reign era (AD 172–178) of Emperor Ling of Han, the stone classics were carved over an eight-year period from AD 175 to 183 into stone stelae set up at the Imperial Academy outside Luoyang.  The project was overseen by Cai Yong and a group of affiliated scholars who "petitioned the emperor to have the Confucian classics carved in stone in order to prevent their being altered to support particular points of view."

The stelae contained 200,000 characters across 46 stelae, and covered the seven classics recognized at the time: the Book of Changes, Book of Documents, Book of Songs, Book of Rites, Spring and Autumn Annals, Classic of Filial Piety and Analects. Cai and other scholars like Ma Midi, Han Yue, Lu Zhi, Yang Bao, Li Xun, and Zhao You would write text onto the stone using cinnabar, which was then engraved. When completed, 28 stela containing the Changes, History, Chunqiu, and the Gongyang commentary, were arranged on the western side of a roughly "U" form. The 15 stela with the Ritual, including the names of Cai Yong and Ma Midi, were placed on the southern side, while the 5 stela containing the Analects were on the eastern side. Scholars could then take rubbings, besides studying the texts.

The stelae were mostly destroyed in the fighting following the collapse of the Han dynasty in 207, and only a few fragments have survived.

See also
Kaicheng Stone Classics

References

External links

 Stone fragments from the Xiping reign in the Chinese stone rubbings database at East Asian Center for Informatics in Humanities, Kyoto University, including two fragments of the classics: 61A and 61B.

2nd-century books
2nd-century inscriptions
Chinese classic texts
Han dynasty literature
Chinese inscriptions
Luoyang
175
Chinese Classical Studies
Series of Chinese books